The Weather Channel Latin America (Spanish: El Canal del Tiempo, Portuguese: Canal do Tempo) is a website which formerly served as a cable and satellite channel based on the American cable and satellite television network, The Weather Channel. The channel was launched in 1996, mainly in Mexico, Colombia, and Argentina, before going on to launch a Portuguese language version for Brazil in 1998. The channel operated from Atlanta, with later sales offices initiated in several Latin American countries, until December 20, 2002, when the network closed the channel to avoid cost cuts at its American operations.

Programs
Tiempo Internacional: 24-hour forecasts for Europe, America and the Americas (at :03:45 past each hour).
Destinos (Destinations): The 3-day forecast for cities in Florida (at :13:35 min past each hour) and cities in Latin America, like Acapulco, Rio de Janeiro and Santo Domingo (at :43:35 min each hour).
Nuestro Planeta / Nosso Planeta (Our Planet): Information about the Earth (at :24:00 and :53:50 past each hour).
Negocios: Similar to TWC's Business Traveler's Forecast (at :28:15 and :58:05 past each hour).
Deportes: Forecasts for sporting events and outdoor activities (at :55:00 past each hour).
Programming blocks launched in September 17, 2001 and continued until the channel's demise:
Primera Vista en las Américas, hosted by Carolina Saiz and Luis Carrera from 5am-12pm ET. 
Ahora en las Américas, hosted by Selene Feria and José Díaz-Arias from 12-8pm ET.
Esta Noche en las Américas, hosted by Katrina Voss and Eduardo Rodriguez from 8pm-5am ET.

Pronóstico Local / Previsão Local

The Latin American version of Local on the 8s, generated on the Weather Star XL platform. Forecasts aired every 10 minutes on the "0s" on the Spanish version and on the "5s" in Brazil. The length of segments is uniformly 2.5 and 5 minutes respectively. Some of the music used for these forecasts ended up playing on Weatherscan operated by The Weather Channel in 2003.

Meteorologists/Forecasters/Executives

Director of Meteorology: Raul E. Jimenez.
Meteorologists (Forecasters): Gladys Diaz, Kathy Hoffman, Jose Lezcano, Vinicius Ubarana, Jacquelina Michienzi.

Director of Production/Programming: Antonio La Greca.

Manager of Production/Programming: Marisa Garcia - Villanueva

Coordinating Producer: Luis Alberto Gonzalez

Former Broadcasters
Guillermo Arduino
Lola Martinez
Eduardo Rodriguez
Carolina Saiz
Katrina Voss
Raul Ayrala
Selene Feria
Maria Antonieta Mejia
Maricarmen Ramos
Luis Carrera
Armando Benitez
Paola Elorza
Sal Morales
 Luis Alberto Gonzalez

References

Websites
The Weather Channel still has a Latin American website as well as a Brazilian version.

Latin America
Latin American cable television networks
Defunct television channels in Mexico
Weather television networks
Television channels and stations established in 1996
Television channels and stations disestablished in 2002
Defunct television channels in Brazil